Cage the Songbird is the eleventh studio album by American country music singer Crystal Gayle. Released on October 17, 1983, it peaked at #5 on the Billboard Country Album chart. Four of the album's tracks became Top 5 hits on the Country Singles chart, with two of them reaching #1. Chronologically they were "The Sound of Goodbye" (#1), "I Don't Wanna Lose Your Love" (#2), "Turning Away" (#1), and "Me Against the Night" (#4).

The title song, "Cage the Songbird", was co-written and first recorded by Elton John in 1976 album, Blue Moves. "Victim or a Fool" was originally recorded by the songwriter, Rodney Crowell on his 1981 eponymous album.

"Take Me Home" was originally sung by Gayle on a Tom Waits composed 1982 soundtrack album called One from the Heart for a movie of the same name.  The version on this album is a re-recorded longer version.

Track listing

Personnel 
Crystal Gayle – vocals
Billy Joe Walker Jr., Reggie Young - electric guitar
Chris Leuzinger - acoustic guitar
David Hungate - bass
Charles Cochran, John Jarvis - grand piano, electric piano
Bobby Wood - organ
Matt Betton - drums
Jim Horn - saxophone, flute, recorder, piccolo flute
Alan Steinberger - synthesizer on "The Sound of Goodbye"
Nashville String Machine, The Sid Sharp Strings - strings
Ava Aldridge, Cindy Richardson - harmony vocals
Larry Muhoberac - string arrangements, conductor
Billy Strange - conductor
Technical
Lee Herschberg, Ron Treat, Steve Tillisch - engineer
Dave Hassinger - remix engineer
Simon Levy - art direction
Laura LiPuma - design
Harry Langdon - photography

Chart performance

Crystal Gayle albums
1983 albums
Albums produced by Jimmy Bowen
Warner Records albums